Jaywalk (foaled March 30, 2016 in Kentucky) is a Thoroughbred filly racehorse who in 2018 won the $2,000,000 Breeders' Cup Juvenile Fillies, the world's richest race of its class. She is trained by John Servis for owners Cash is King, LLC (Charles J. Zacney, et al.) and D J Stable, LL (Leonard C. Green).

Breeding
Bred in Kentucky by Gainesway Thoroughbreds Ltd., Jaywalk was sired by Grade 1 winner Cross Traffic. He was a son of Unbridled's Song who won the 1995 Breeders' Cup Juvenile and in 2017 was the Leading sire in North America. Jaywalk's dam was Lady Pewitt who made only one race start. She was the daughter of 2002 Breeders' Cup Sprint winner and the 2002 American Champion Sprint Horse Orientate.

Pedigree

References

2016 racehorse births
Racehorses bred in Kentucky
Racehorses trained in the United States
Breeders' Cup Juvenile Fillies winners
Thoroughbred family 19-b